Giuseppe Aliberti (5 March 1901 – 8 January 1956) was an Italian football manager and former player who played as a midfielder.

Career
Aliberti played 3 seasons (31 games) in the Italian Serie A with A.C. Torino. Aliberti made his debut for the Italy national football team on 1 January 1923 in a game against Germany. He represented Italy at the 1924 Summer Olympics.

Honours

Player

Club
 Torino
 Italian Football Championship/Serie A: 1927–28

References

External links
 

1901 births
1956 deaths
Italian footballers
Italy international footballers
Serie A players
Olympic footballers of Italy
Footballers at the 1924 Summer Olympics
Torino F.C. players
Association football midfielders
A.S.D. La Biellese players
A.S.D. La Biellese managers